Palo Alto Plantation is an historic mansion located at the corner of LA-1 and LA-944, along Bayou Lafourche in Donaldsonville in Ascension Parish, Louisiana. It was built in c.1847 and was added to the National Register of Historic Places on April 13, 1977. The architecture is an Anglo-Creole type Louisiana plantation cottage decorated in Greek Revival style.

History 
The first recorded owners of the plantation were Pierre Oscar Ayraud and his wife, Rosalie Rodriguez, who acquired the house from succession of Rosalie's father, Mathias Rodriguez, in 1852. The house is thought to be designed by architect, James Dakin based on its style.

This house was subject to multiple painting by French-born artist, Marie Adrien Persac (1823–1873).

The plantation house is a -story building on brick piers with a twelve-foot-wide porch set under the roof line. The window panes of the house are more than 170 years old and contain etchings with names and initials, and it is said to be how the family would check if their engagement diamond rings were real. The doorknobs are lower than a modern home, because the average height of people was shorter.

In 1860, the Lemann family purchased the home, and as of 2019 it is still owned by the family and used as a bed and breakfast and for events.

References

See also
National Register of Historic Places listings in Ascension Parish, Louisiana
Palo Alto Plantation House architecture drawings (1933) at Library of Congress

Houses on the National Register of Historic Places in Louisiana
Houses completed in 1850
Houses in Ascension Parish, Louisiana
Plantation houses in Louisiana
Donaldsonville, Louisiana
National Register of Historic Places in Ascension Parish, Louisiana